Taxinge-Näsby Castle is a stately home in Sweden. The Ingmar Bergman film Cries and Whispers was filmed in and around the mansion.

During the 2010s, Hela Sverige bakar was recorded there.

See also
List of castles in Sweden

References

Castles in Södermanland County